Caryocolum cauligenella is a moth of the family Gelechiidae. It is found in most of Europe, except Ireland, Great Britain, Norway and most of the Balkan Peninsula. 

The wingspan is 11–13 mm. The forewings are dark brown, flecked with cream. There are three indistinct white transverse fasciae at one-quarter, one-half and four-fifths, mottled with light brown.  Adults are on wing in June.

The larvae feed on Silene species, including Silene gallica, Silene nutans and Silene vulgaris. They initially feed inside stem galls on their host plant. Pupation takes place outside of the gall in a white spinning in the soil.

References

Moths described in 1863
cauligenella
Moths of Europe